Gehlert is an Ortsgemeinde – a community belonging to a Verbandsgemeinde – in the Westerwaldkreis in Rhineland-Palatinate, Germany.

Geography

The community lies in the Westerwald between Limburg and Siegen, roughly 2 km south of Hachenburg. Gehlert belongs to the Verbandsgemeinde of Hachenburg, a kind of collective municipality. Its seat is in the like-named town.

History
In 1255, Gehlert had its first documentary mention as Geilinrode.

Politics

The municipal council is made up of 12 council members who were elected in a majority vote in a municipal election on 7 June 2009.

Regular events
The yearly Whitsun kermis is the highlight of community life.

Economy and infrastructure

Northwest of the community runs Bundesstraße 413 leading from Bendorf (near Koblenz) to Hachenburg. The nearest Autobahn interchanges are in Siegen, Wilnsdorf and Herborn on the A 45 (Dortmund–Gießen) and also in Mogendorf on the A 3 (Cologne–Frankfurt), some 25 km away. The nearest InterCityExpress stop is the railway station at Montabaur on the Cologne-Frankfurt high-speed rail line.

References

External links
Gehlert
Gehlert in the collective municipality’s Web pages 

Municipalities in Rhineland-Palatinate
Westerwaldkreis